The 2005 Brno DTM round was a motor racing event for the Deutsche Tourenwagen Masters held between 3–5 June 2005. The event, part of the 19th season of the DTM, was held at the Brno Circuit in Czech Republic.

Results

Qualifying

Race

Championship standings after the race 

 Note: Only the top five positions are included for three sets of standings.

References

External links 
Official website

|- style="text-align:center"
| width="35%"| Previous race:
| width="30%"| Deutsche Tourenwagen Masters2005 season
| width="40%"| Next race:

Motorsport in the Czech Republic
2005 in motorsport
Deutsche Tourenwagen Masters